Chinnadagudihundi is a village in Mysore district, Karnataka, India.

Situation
The village is located by the highway between Nanjangud and Chamarajanagar.

Economy
Most of the villagers are employed in the agricultural sector, growing their own crops. There are five provision stores and two tea shops in the village. It has no restaurants or lodges.

Transportation
Chinnadagudihundi railway station is on the Mysore–Chamarajanagar branch line. This station is the closest to Chinnadagudihundi.

The nearest major railway station is Mysore Junction.

See also
Sujatha Puram Halt
Nanjangud Town
Badanavalu 
Narasam Budhi

Image gallery

References

Villages in Mysore district